Lys Kernow, previously known as New County Hall between 1966 and 2009,  is a municipal facility at Treyew Road in Truro, Cornwall. The house, which was at the north end of the site, was retained for use as the county register office. Old County Hall, which remains the official the headquarters of Cornwall Council, is a Grade II listed building.

History
During the first half of the 20th century Cornwall County Council held its meetings at the Old County Hall at Station Road in Truro. After deciding that the Old County Hall was inadequate for their needs, council leaders decided to procure a new purpose-built building: the site selected had been occupied by the grounds of a private house known as Dalvenie, as well as some surrounding fields.

The new building was designed by the County Architect, Francis Kenneth Hicklin, and his successor, Alan Groves, in the Brutalist style and was officially opened by Queen Elizabeth II on 14 July 1966. The design involved a three-storey square concrete-framed structure with circa 50 bays on each side; the bays contained a window on each floor flanked by concrete slabs. Internally, the principal room was the council chamber which was on the first floor and was cantilevered out of the main building on the east side. There was a courtyard, landscaped by Sir Geoffrey Jellicoe, in the centre of the building; a sculpture by Barbara Hepworth, known as "Rock form, Porthcurno", was unveiled in the courtyard garden when the building opened.

Following the abolition of Cornwall County Council in April 2009, the building became the headquarters of the new unitary authority, Cornwall Council. This was followed by an extensive programme of refurbishment works, to a design by Poynton Bradbury Wynter Cole of St Ives, which was completed in 2013.

The building contains an extensive collection of modern art including a painting by the Cornish fisherman and artist, Alfred Wallis, depicting the harbour entrance at Penzance.

References

Grade II listed buildings in Cornwall
Truro
T
Government buildings completed in 1966
Brutalist architecture in England